CHYH-FM is a radio station that broadcasts on a frequency of 90.3 FM in Taloyoak, Nunavut, Canada.

The station is owned by Taloyoakmiut Nipingit Society.

External links

Hyh
Year of establishment missing